Mark Evans (born August 16, 1957, in Toronto, Ontario) is a Canadian rower. 

Evans was a member of the Canadian men's eights team that won the gold medal at the 1984 Summer Olympics in Los Angeles, USA. His twin brother Michael was on the same winning team. The rowing team was inducted into the BC Sports Hall of Fame in 1985, and the Canadian Olympic Hall of Fame in 2003. Both brothers had previously studied at University College, Oxford.

References

External links
Canadian Olympic Committee

1957 births
Living people
Alumni of University College, Oxford
Canadian male rowers
Canadian people of Welsh descent
Medalists at the 1984 Summer Olympics
Olympic gold medalists for Canada
Olympic medalists in rowing
Olympic rowers of Canada
Rowers at the 1984 Summer Olympics
Rowers from Toronto
Canadian twins
Twin sportspeople
20th-century Canadian people